Emily Hosker-Thornhill (born 27 October 1992) is a British long-distance runner.

In 2017, she competed in the senior women's race at the 2017 IAAF World Cross Country Championships held in Kampala, Uganda. She finished in 89th place.

In 2019, she competed in the senior women's race at the 2019 IAAF World Cross Country Championships held in Aarhus, Denmark. She finished in 48th place.

References

External links 
 

Living people
1992 births
Place of birth missing (living people)
British female cross country runners
British female long-distance runners
20th-century British women
21st-century British women